Haslefoot Bridges (died about 1677) was an English Puritan minister, who was ejected from St Alban, Wood Street in 1662.

Bridges studied at St. John's College, Cambridge and has been described as "much admired, though of a reserved disposition."

Bridges was a signatory to "A seasonable exhortation of sundry ministers in London" and "To the Christian reader, especially heads of families" the latter being a document attached to the Westminster Standards.

References

Ejected English ministers of 1662
Alumni of St John's College, Cambridge
1670s deaths
Year of birth unknown